Cervarese Santa Croce is a comune (municipality) in the Province of Padua in the Italian region Veneto, located about  west of Venice and about  west of Padua. The communal seat is in the frazione of Fossona.

Cervarese Santa Croce borders the following municipalities: Montegalda, Montegaldella, Rovolon, Saccolongo, Teolo, Veggiano.

The Castello di San Martino, on the Bacchiglione river, is a medieval castle surrounded by a park, a popular destination for walks.

References

External links
 Official website

Cities and towns in Veneto